Gustave-Auguste Jeanneret (1847–1927) was a Swiss painter.

References
Pascal Ruedin, Gustave Jeanneret (exhibition catalog), Attinger Giles (1998)
 
 https://maitron.fr/spip.php?article62326
 https://archive.org/details/dictionnairecrit02bene/page/717/mode/1up?view=theater

External links 

 Biography and appreciation @ Le Château de Boudry
 
 More works by Jeanneret @ ArtNet

1847 births
1927 deaths
Swiss painters
Swiss anarchists
Genre painters
Swiss landscape painters